Parry Sound (Roberts Lake) Water Aerodrome  is located  east southeast of Parry Sound, Ontario, Canada.

See also
 List of airports in the Parry Sound area

References

Registered aerodromes in Parry Sound District
Transport in Parry Sound District
Transport in Parry Sound, Ontario
Seaplane bases in Ontario